CCDC186 is a protein that in humans is encoded by the CCDC186 gene The CCDC186 gene is also known as the CTCL-tumor associated antigen with accession number NM_018017.

Gene

Location 
CCDC186 has the chromosome location of 10q25.3 and is 53,750 bases in size oriented on the minus strand. PSORTII Protein k-NN Prediction indicated that C10orf118 is 65.2% of the time nuclear, 17.4% cytosolic, 8.7% mitochondrial, 4.3% vesicles of secretory system, and 4.3% endoplasmic reticulum.

Expression 
Analysis of gene expression in humans and other species indicates C10orf118 is ubiquitously expressed in all tissue types at varying developmental stages. An EST profile from NCBI displayed the greatest expression in bone marrow, kidneys, and the prostate cell lines. Breakdown by health state indicates high expression of C10orf118 in bladder carcinoma and prostate cancer.

Protein

General Properties 
The protein of CCDC186 (NP_060487) is 898 amino acids in length. The predicted molecular weight is 103.7kdal and the isoelectric point is predicted to be 5.92.

Composition 
A serine rich region is observed in amino acids 710-747. A compositional analysis revealed that C10orf118 is Proline (1.1%) poor and Glutamic acid (14.1%) and Lysine (12.0%) rich.

Interactions 
CCDC186 protein was found to interact with proteins PLEKAH5, Ezra, GAMMAHV.ORF23, and SMAD3.

Homology  
Orthologous sequences of CCDC186 were not found to be in bacteria, archea, protist, or plants. CCDC186 has no human paralogs. The date of divergence for the orthologous sequences highly correlates with the sequences similarity in that the percent identity decreases as you go back in time. Closely related orthologs include mammals and birds and moderately related orthologs include other vertebrates such as fish, reptiles, and amphibians. Distantly related orthologous sequences are primarily observed in invertebrates.

Motifs

Post Translational Modification 
CCDC186 is predicted to undergo multiple posttranslational modifications including predicted O-beta-GlcNAc attachment, phosphorylation, a nuclear export signal, glycation of lysines, GlcNAc O-glycosylation, N-glycosylation, and NetCorona sites.

Clinical significance
Prior research indicates that the open reading frame of C10orf118 is linked to cutaneous T-cell lymphoma by a tumor antigen L14-2. The protein CCDC186 is also found at higher than normal levels in the breast cancer cell line BC 8701.

References

External links

Further reading